During the 1996–97 English football season, Oxford United F.C. competed in the Football League First Division.

Season summary
The 1996–97 season saw Oxford looking hopeful of gaining promotion to the Premier League, but the squad lacked the strength to make their form consistent and they finished seventeenth, following the sale of star defender Matt Elliott to Leicester City.

Final league table

Results
Oxford United's score comes first

Legend

Football League First Division

FA Cup

League Cup

Squad

References

Oxford United F.C. seasons
Oxford United